Stephen Jones (born July 1, 1940), is an attorney who took on a series of high-profile civil rights cases beginning with his defense of a Vietnam War protester. Jones later represented Timothy McVeigh, and then the fraternity involved in the 2015 University of Oklahoma Sigma Alpha Epsilon racism incident.

Biography
Stephen Jones was born on July 1, 1940 in Lafayette, Louisiana. His father was an oil field supplies sales manager and his mother was the bookkeeper for a wealthy financier. Jones grew up in suburban Houston, received a law degree from the University of Oklahoma in 1966 and settled in Enid, Oklahoma where he still lives. Jones was a member of Phi Alpha Delta and served as Associate Editor of the Oklahoma Bar Journal from 1979 to 1986. He has been married to his wife Sherrel for the last 40 years and they have raised four children.

Legal career
On May 5, 1970, the day after National Guardsmen had shot and killed four students at Kent State University, Keith Green was arrested at the University of Oklahoma for carrying a Viet Cong flag in violation of a state law prohibiting the display of a "red flag or emblem of anarchy or rebellion". After 12 lawyers had refused to defend the student, Jones took the case and was promptly dismissed from the Enid, Oklahoma law firm where he was employed. Jones argued in court that the disloyalty statute was unconstitutional and the judge dismissed the case, overturning the statute. Later Jones would go on to represent Abbie Hoffman, the radical Yippie, when Oklahoma State University refused to let him speak on campus.

Jones ran unsuccessfully for public office four times, including a U.S. Senate race against David L. Boren in 1990.

In 1995, Stephen Jones became the lead defense attorney for Timothy McVeigh, who was charged with the Oklahoma City bombing. McVeigh wanted to use the "necessity defense", but Jones took a different tack, even traveling to other countries in search of evidence because he believed that McVeigh did not act alone in the bombing. McVeigh went on trial in 1997, was convicted on all counts and sentenced to death, and was executed in 2001.  Defense attorney and law professor David Bruck uses Stephen Jones' post-trial actions as an example, though, of what lawyers should not do in representing a client or guarding attorney-client privileges.

Jones served as the attorney for a former House page involved in the Mark Foley scandal. He also served as the defense lawyer for Raye Dawn Smith in the trial concerning the rampant abuse and eventual murder of her daughter Kelsey Smith-Briggs.

In 2015 Jones was hired by the fraternity chapter involved in the 2015 University of Oklahoma Sigma Alpha Epsilon racism incident to explore the chapter's legal options.

Areas of practice

Bar admissions
 1966, Oklahoma
 1969, U.S. Court of Appeals, Tenth Circuit and U.S. District Court, Western District of Oklahoma
 1970, U.S. Tax Court and U.S. Supreme Court
 1973, U.S. Court of Appeals, Eighth Circuit
 1975, U.S. Court of Appeals, Second Circuit and U.S. Court of Appeals, *District of Columbia
 1979, U.S. District Court, Northern District of Oklahoma
 1980, U.S. Claims Court
 1982, U.S. Court of Appeals, Federal Circuit

Publications
 "John W. Davis," Oklahoma Law Review Vol. 27 No. 1, Winter, 1974
 "The Case Against Presidential Impeachment," Oklahoma Bar Association Journal, Oklahoma Criminal Defense form book, 1974
 "Oklahoma Politics," Vol. I, 1907-1962
 "Was President Nixon Guilty: The Case For The Defense," Oklahoma Bar Association Journal, Winter 1978
 "Vernon's Oklahoma Forms, 2d: Criminal Law, Practice & Procedure," West Group, 1999
 "U.S. v. McVeigh: Defending the 'Most Hated Man in America,'" Oklahoma Law Review Vol. 51 No. 4, Winter, 1998
 "A Lawyer's Ethical Duty to Represent the Unpopular Client," Chapman Law Review Vol. 1 No. 1. Spring, 1998
 "Representing Timothy McVeigh", Litigation, Spring, 2002, Vol. 28, Number 3.

Books
 Others Unknown: The Oklahoma City Bombing Case and Conspiracy, with Peter Israel, 2001

Professional positions
 Chester Bedell Memorial Lecturer, "The Independence of American Lawyers," The Florida Bar, 1999.
 Assistant Professor, University of Oklahoma, 1973-1976
 Adjunct Professor, Phillips University, 1983-1990
 Secretary, Minority Conference, Texas Legislature, 1960-1961
 Assistant to Honorable Richard Nixon, New York, 1964
 Administrative Assistant, Congressman Paul Findley, Washington, D.C., 1966-1969
 Legal Assistant to Governor of Oklahoma, 1967
 Member, U.S. Delegation to NATO (North Atlantic Assembly), 1968
 Special Assistant District Attorney, 1977
 Member, State Supreme Court Committee on Civil Jury Instructions, 1979-1981
 Special United States Attorney, Northern District of Oklahoma, 1979
 Special Counsel to the Governor of Oklahoma, 1995
 Member, Oklahoma Court of Criminal Appeals Advisory Committee on Court Rules, 1980
 Judge of Temporary Division, Oklahoma Court of Appeals, 1982
 Republican Nominee, United States Senate, 1990

Notes

References
 
 
 The Meaning of Timothy McVeigh Gore Vidal, September 2001

External links 
Voices of Oklahoma interview with Stephen Jones. First person interview conducted on January 27, 2010, with Stephen Jones.

1940 births
Living people
Oklahoma City bombing
Oklahoma lawyers
Oklahoma Republicans
Criminal defense lawyers
University of Oklahoma alumni
University of Oklahoma faculty
Phillips University faculty
Lawyers from Enid, Oklahoma
20th-century American lawyers